José Manuel Martín Pérez (24 May 1924 – 12 April 2006) was a Spanish film and television actor, radio broadcaster, and screenwriter. He was a popular character actor in Spanish cinema during the 1950s and 60s, best remembered for playing villainous henchmen, appearing in more than 100 film and television productions.

Born in Casavieja, Spain, Martín studied at Madrid's Teatro Español Universitario and the Lope de Rueda, and began working for Radio Nacional de España in 1942, before making his feature film debut in César Fernández Ardavín's 1952 war drama La llamada de África starring Ali Beiba Uld Abidin, Yahadid Ben Ahmed Lehbib and Farachi Ben Emboiric.

Martín was particularly noted for his work in the Spaghetti Western genre, alongside regulars such as Aldo Sambrell and Andrea Scotti, with supporting roles in Savage Guns (1961), Gunfighters of Casa Grande (1964), Minnesota Clay(1964), A Pistol for Ringo (1965), Seven Dollars on the Red (1966), Arizona Colt (1966), A Bullet for the General (1966), Blood River (1967), 100 Rifles (1969), and Cut-Throats Nine (1972). He also had memorable roles in EuroHorror films such as Sax Rohmer's The Castle of Fu Manchu (1969), The Sinister Eyes of Dr. Orloff (1973), Count Dracula's Great Love (1974), and Curse of the Devil (1974).

Early life
José Manuel Martín Pérez was born on 24 May 1924 in Casavieja, Ávila, Castilla y León, Spain . He initially studied at the Teatro Español Universitario in Madrid with José Luis López Vázquez, María Jesús Valdés and Valeriano Andrés before obtaining a scholarship at the Lope de Rueda. It was there that he started working in professional theater under Alejandro Ulloa. Starting in 1942, he was also employed as a broadcaster for Radio Nacional de España. Martín eventually received a bachelor degree in journalism.

Career

At age 28, Martín made his feature film debut in the war drama La llamada de África (1952), written and directed by César Fernández Ardavín, and starred Ali Beiba Uld Abidin, Yahadid Ben Ahmed Lehbib and Farachi Ben Emboiric. This was followed by minor roles in Ángel Vilches' adventure film A dos grados del ecuador (1953), the Luis Lucia comedy Aeropuerto (1953), and Rafael Gil's religious-themed historical dramas I Was a Parish Priest (1953) and Judas' Kiss (1954). He received his first supporting role, as Muñoz, in Gil's next film Murió hace quince años (1954) appearing alongside Rafael Rivelles, Francisco Rabal and Lyla Rocco. He made two other films with Gil, La otra vida del capitán Contreras (1955) and El canto del gallo (1955), as well part of the supporting cast in Javier Setó's dramas Duelo de pasiones (1956) and Ha pasado un hombre (1956), Pedro Luis Ramírez's comedy Los ladrones somos gente honrada (1956), and José María Ochoa's La mestiza (1956). He appeared in one more film for Rafael Gil that same year, Miracle of the White Suit (1956), and landed an important supporting roles in Spanish Affair (1957), co-directed by Don Siegel and Luis Marquina, Sergio Corbucci's Ángeles sin cielo (1957), and Luis Buñuel's Viridiana (1961). He also started working in television joining the cast of Diego Valor in 1958. Martín continued on in supporting roles for number of other films then being shot in Almería and elsewhere.

Spaghetti Westerns

In the early-1960s, Eurowesterns, which would evolve into the popular Spaghetti Westerns, were being shot in Almería. Martín was among a number of Spanish character actors to find fame in this new genre. His background playing villains made him ideal for being cast as a Mexican bandit or henchman. Martín's prolific appearances made him was one of the most recognizable Spanish actors involved in the genre, rivaling those of fellow Spaghetti Western regulars such as Aldo Sambrell and Andrea Scotti, and is considered one of the best villains of the era.

His last Italo-Western appearance, Amigo, Stay Away, was an uncredited role as a peddler.

In between Spaghetti Westerns, Martín also had supporting roles in The Ceremony (1963), Operation Atlantis (1965), Fall of the Mohicans (1965), Con el viento solano (1966), and Bewitched Love (1967).

Later career
In the late-1960s and 70s, Martín starred in Spanish horror films such as Sax Rohmer's The Castle of Fu Manchu (1969), The Sinister Eyes of Dr. Orloff (1973), Count Dracula's Great Love (1974), and Curse of the Devil (1974). An author of numerous poems, he occasionally tried his hand at screenwriting. His first script was for Rafael Romero Marchent's The Student Connection (1974), co-written with Luciano Ercoli, José Luis Navarro, and Marchent.

Martín went into semi-retirement in the late-1970s. He made several guest appearances on the popular action-adventure television series Curro Jiménez, starring Sancho Gracia, in 1977. Other notable performances included supporting roles in Alberto Vázquez Figueroa's Oro rojo (1978), Mariano Ozores' comedy western Al este del oeste (1984), Jaime Camino's Spanish Civil War film Dragón Rapide (1986), and the Peter Lilienthal sports film Der Radfahrer von San Cristóbal (1988). His last regular film  was an uncredited role in Montoyas y Tarantos (1989) followed by a final appearance in the crime-drama film Amor propio (1994) directed by Mario Camus. He also wrote two more scripts during the decade: Ángel Martínez Astudillo short film El pisito (1996) and the comedy Maestros (2000), which he co-wrote with director Óscar del Caz.

In the early-2000s, Martín made one-time guest appearances on television series Policías, en el corazón de la calle and Los Serrano. He also had a cameo on Dunia Ayaso and Félix Sabroso's dramady Descongélate! (2003), starring Pepón Nieto, Candela Peña and Loles León.

Personal life and death
Martín died on 12 April 2006, at the age of 81.

Filmography 

As a screenwriter

Television

References

Further reading
Frayling, Christopher. Spaghetti Westerns: Cowboys and Europeans from Karl May to Sergio Leone. 2nd ed. London and New York: I.B. Tauris, 1998. 
Gasca, Luis. Un siglo de cine español. Barcelona: Planeta, 1998.

External links

1924 births
2006 deaths
Male Spaghetti Western actors
People from Ávila, Spain
Spanish male film actors
Spanish male poets
Spanish male television actors
Spanish poets